Urmila Unni is an Indian classical dancer and actress who predominantly works in Malayalam cinema. Her daughter Utthara Unni is also an actress.

Personal life
Unni was born on June 14th, 1962 into a royal family as the daughter of K. C. Anujanraja Kottakal Kovilakam and Nedupuram Kottarathil Manorama at Nedumpuram Palace, Thiruvalla. She had her primary education from Infant Jesus Convent Thrissur and a former student of Sree Kerala Varma College, Thrissur. She learned Mohiniyattam, Bharathanatyam, Kathakali and Veena. She is also a painter.

She is married to Ankarath Ramanunni. The couple have a daughter Utthara Unni who is also an actress and dancer. Currently they are residing at Kadavanthra, Ernakulam. They have started a dance school Angopanga at Bahrain. Actress Samyuktha Varma is her niece. She is the author of Cinema Katha and Panchalika.

Filmography

Television serials

Rakkuyil  (Mazhavil Manorama)
Ottachilambu (Mazhavil Manorama)
Amruthavarshini (Janam TV)
Sreekrishnavijayam (Janam TV)
Njangal Santhushtaranu (Asianet Plus)
Devimahathmyam (Asianet)
Kunjalimarakkar (Asianet)
Pazhassiraja (Surya TV)
 Velankani Mathavu (Surya TV)
 Nizhalattom (DD)
 Mughmariyathey (Surya TV)
 Kathayariyathey (Surya TV)
Manasariyathe (Surya TV)
 Priyam (Kairali)
 Orma (Asianet)
 Mangalyam (Asianet)
Nizhalukal (Asianet)
Sankeerthanam Pole (Asianet)
 Neeti Vacha Madhuvidhu (DD)
 Melottu Kozhiyunna Ilakal (Doordarshan)
 Darussalam(DD)
 Theekkali Internet Pollumbol (Surya TV) 
 Manassariyathe (Surya TV)
Ponnunjal (Asianet)
 Sree Mahabhagavatham (Asianet)
Kadamattathu Kathanar (Asianet)
Idavazhiyile Poocha Mindapoocha  (Asianet)
 Sthree (Asianet)
Poothali (Amrita TV)
Parvanendu
Manalnagaram
Parinamam
 Mounanombaram (Kairali TV)
Sakunam ( DD Malayalam) - telefilm
Ente Mash - telefilm
Kalippata Kadayile Sthree - telefilm

TV Shows

 Ruchibhedham as Presenter
 Thani Nadan as Presenter
 Smart Show as Participant
 Red Carpet as Mentor

References

External links
 
 Urmila Unni at MSI
 Official website

Living people
Actresses from Kerala
Actresses in Malayalam cinema
Indian film actresses
Performers of Indian classical dance
Sree Kerala Varma College alumni
People from Thiruvalla
Dancers from Kerala
Indian female classical dancers
20th-century Indian actresses
21st-century Indian actresses
Indian television actresses
Actresses in Malayalam television
Actresses in Tamil cinema
1962 births